Trade stimulators were countertop machines widely used to encourage shoppers to indulge in a game of chance. They became popular in American saloons during the 1880s, their use spreading to cigar, confectionery and general stores. Produced in a wide range of designs, they were developed during the same era as slot machines and were operated by inserting a coin and pulling a lever, the player standing to win prizes of cigars, cigarettes, candy and other goods if a winning combination came up. During periods when gambling was prohibited or in states where gambling was illegal, these machines could be used with little fear of prosecution.

See also
Caille Bros. Company
Mills Novelty Company
H. C. Evans
Slot machine
Amusement arcade

External links
 Gaming History, biggest trade stimulator database
 International Arcade Museum - Trade Stimulators

References

Gaming devices